Mansfield Hollow Lake is a reservoir resting on the border of Windham County and Tolland County, Connecticut. The reservoir provides drinking water for Willimantic and helps control flooding in the 159-square-mile Thames River watershed. It was created by the Mansfield Hollow Dam and is entirely contained within Mansfield Hollow State Park and the Mansfield Hollow Wildlife Area. Designed and constructed by the United States Army Corps of Engineers, the dam substantially reduces flooding along the Quinebaug, Shetucket, and Thames rivers. Construction of the project began in 1949 with completion in 1952 at a cost of US$6.5 million. The Mansfield Hollow reservoir is located within the Shetucket River Watershed and is part of the Thames River Basin. Access to the site is available from US Route 6 and State Route 195.

Description
The spillway comprises a concrete weir  in length. The weir's crest elevation is  lower than the top of the dam.

Recreation
Mansfield Hollow State Park is located on Bassett Bridge Road in the town of Mansfield. The park offers boating (8 mph limit), fishing, a shaded picnic area and many miles of hiking, mountain biking and cross-country ski trails. A boat launch is located on Bassett Bridge Road in the town of Mansfield, 1/2 mile east of the state park entrance. It is open daily from 8 a.m. to sunset. There is no entrance fee. This area is managed by the Connecticut Department of Energy and Environmental Protection.

Mansfield Hollow Dam is located on Mansfield Hollow Road in the town of Mansfield. Visitors can picnic on the lawn both downstream of the dam and on the lake side of the dam. The top of the dam is popular for walking, jogging, and biking. Parking is available at the State Park, Damsite, Commuter Parking Lot on US Route 6, and athletic field parking lot on State Route 89. The dam runs alongside Windham Airport.

See also
Last Green Valley National Heritage Corridor
National Register of Historic Places listings in Tolland County, Connecticut
National Register of Historic Places listings in Windham County, Connecticut

References

External links
Mansfield Hollow Lake U.S. Army Corps of Engineers
Mansfield Hollow State Park Connecticut Department of Energy and Environmental Protection

Mansfield, Connecticut
Reservoirs in Connecticut
Willimantic, Connecticut
Lakes of Windham County, Connecticut
Lakes of Tolland County, Connecticut
Windham, Connecticut
Protected areas established in 1952
Dams on the National Register of Historic Places in Connecticut
Buildings and structures in Tolland County, Connecticut
Buildings and structures in Windham County, Connecticut
Dams completed in 1952
Protected areas of Windham County, Connecticut
Protected areas of Tolland County, Connecticut
United States Army Corps of Engineers dams
State parks of Connecticut
National Register of Historic Places in Tolland County, Connecticut
National Register of Historic Places in Windham County, Connecticut
1952 establishments in Connecticut